Blue Ridge is a census-designated place (CDP) in Botetourt County, Virginia, United States. The population was 3,185 at the 2020 census. It is part of the Roanoke Metropolitan Statistical Area.

Geography
According to the United States Census Bureau, the CDP has a total area of 6.088 square miles (15.77 km²).

Demographics

2020 census
As of the census of 2020, there were 3,185 people residing in the CDP. There were 1,318 housing units. The racial makeup of the CDP was 92.0% White, 2.9% African American or Black, 0.1% American Indian, 0.5% Asian, 0.0% Pacific Islander, 0.5% from other races, and 4.0% from two or more races. Hispanic or Latino of any race were 1.8% of the population. 

The 2020 American Community Survey 5-Year Estimates found that median income for a household in the CDP was $78,536, and the median income for a family was $86,714. 3.1% of the population were living below the poverty line, including 1.8% of those under 18 and 4.6% of those 65 and older.

2010 census
As of the census of 2010, there were 3,084 people residing in the CDP. There were 1,269 housing units. The racial makeup of the CDP was 95.8% White, 2.6% African American, 0.2% Native American, 0.4% Asian, 0.0% Pacific Islander, 0.2% from other races, and 0.9% from two or more races. Hispanic or Latino of any race were 0.8% of the population.

2000 census
As of the census of 2000, there were 3,188 people, 1,181 households, and 968 families residing in the CDP. The population density was 504.1 people per square mile (194.8/km²). There were 1,219 housing units at an average density of 192.8/sq mi (74.5/km²). The racial makeup of the CDP was 95.33% White, 2.85% African American, 0.22% Native American, 0.50% Asian, 0.06% from other race, and 1.04% from two or more races. Hispanic or Latino of any race were 0.53% of the population.

There were 1,181 households, out of which 34.8% had children under the age of 18 living with them, 72.5% were married couples living together, 6.9% had a female householder with no husband present, and 18.0% were non-families. 15.1% of all households were made up of individuals, and 6.1% had someone living alone who was 65 years of age or older. The average household size was 2.70 and the average family size was 2.99.

In the CDP, the population was spread out, with 25.0% under the age of 18, 4.9% from 18 to 24, 29.6% from 25 to 44, 30.1% from 45 to 64, and 10.5% who were 65 years of age or older. The median age was 40 years. For every 100 females there were 93.0 males. For every 100 females age 18 and over, there were 92.3 males.

The median income for a household in the CDP was $59,239, and the median income for a family was $63,926. Males had a median income of $39,226 versus $27,284 for females. The per capita income for the CDP was $24,683. None of the families and 2.4% of the population were living below the poverty line, including no under eighteens and 7.9% of those over 64.

Government
The United States Postal Service operates the Blue Ridge Post Office within the CDP. The Blue Ridge ZIP code extends into parts of neighboring Bedford County.

Law enforcement is provided by the Botetourt County Sheriff's Office. Fire protection and emergency medical services are provided by the Botetourt County Department of Fire and EMS and the Blue Ridge Volunteer Fire Department and Rescue Squad, which operates a fire station within the CDP.

Education
The CDP is served by Botetourt County Public Schools. Public school students residing in Blue Ridge are zoned to attend Colonial Elementary School, Read Mountain Middle School, and Lord Botetourt High School.

Transportation

Air
The Roanoke-Blacksburg Regional Airport is the closest airport with commercial service to the CDP.

Highways
 US Route 221
 US Route 460
 Blue Ridge Parkway

Rail
A Norfolk Southern rail line runs through the CDP. The closest passenger rail service is located in Roanoke.

References

Census-designated places in Botetourt County, Virginia